Sharwanand Myneni (born 6 March 1984), known mononymously as Sharwanand, is an Indian actor and producer who primarily works in Telugu films alongside a few Tamil films. He made his acting debut in 2004 with the film Aidho Tareekhu.

For Engeyum Eppodhum (2011), he received SIIMA Award for Best Male Debut - Tamil, he has also won Nandi Special Jury Award for Malli Malli Idi Rani Roju (2015).

Sharwanand initially acted in films including Prasthanam, Engeyum Eppodhum, Run Raja Run and Malli Malli Idi Rani Roju. He then starred in several films including Express Raja, Sathamanam Bhavati and Mahanubhavudu.

Early and personal life
Sharwanand Myneni was born in Vijayawada, Andhra Pradesh to Myneni Vasundhara Devi and Myneni Ratnagiri Vara Prasad Rao, and brought up in Hyderabad, Telangana. He did his schooling from The Hyderabad Public School, Begumpet (where he was classmates with Ram Charan and Rana Daggubati) and completed his Bachelor of Commerce (B.Com.) from Wesley Degree College, Secunderabad. During his college days, Sharwanand was selected as "The Hindu's Best New Face". At the age of 17, Sharwanand attended Kishore Namit Kapoor Acting Institute in Mumbai.

Sharwanand hails from a closely knit business family. Ram Pothineni, who is also an actor, is his cousin.

Sharwanand got engaged to Rakshita Reddy, a U.S.-based techie, on 26 January 2023. Rakshita is the daughter of Andhra Pradesh High Court lawyer Pasunoor Madhusudhan Reddy and Pasunoor Sudha Reddy.

Career

Early career and supporting roles (2003–⁠2005) 
Sharwanand first came to media attention in a Thums Up advertisement with Chiranjeevi. He later made his acting debut in Telugu with Aidho Tareeku in 2003 and proceeded to share screen space with Chiranjeevi in Shankar Dada M.B.B.S. and with Venkatesh in Sankranthi and Lakshmi in supporting roles.

Critical acclaim and forays into Tamil cinema (2005–⁠2014) 
Sharwanand rose to stardom with Vennela (2005) and Amma Cheppindi (2006), the latter of which earned him critical acclaim. He then acted in films like Gamyam (2008) and Andari Bandhuvaya (2010) which, despite being sleeper hits, earned Nandi Awards. Prasthanam was a cult classic. These films won him accolades. 

Sharwanand then forayed into Tamil cinema with films such as Naalai Namadhe (2009) and Engeyum Eppodhum (2011). In 2012, Sharwanand made his debut as a producer with his film, Ko Ante Koti, which was produced under Sarvaa Arts.

Commercial breakthrough and success (2014–⁠present) 
Sharwanand got his commercial breakthrough with the film, Run Raja Run, which was one of the blockbusters of the year 2014. This film, produced by UV Creations, was the second venture after their first blockbuster film, Mirchi. Sharwanand's portrayal of the lead, Raja, won him accolades. Sharwanand new look in the film with bright and colourful outfits is an added boost for his character's portrayal. Sharwanand's next film was Malli Malli Idi Rani Roju, with Nithya Menen, directed by Kranthi Madhav, which received positive applause from critics and ran as a decent movie. Sharwanand's following film was Express Raja, which was a hit at the box office.

Cheran's directorial venture JK Enum Nanbanin Vaazhkai, which was released in Telugu in 2016 with Nithya Menen was below average at the box office.

Sharwanand's movie Sathamanam Bhavati collected almost 50 crores, produced by Dil Raju and directed by Satish Vegesna.

Sharwanand released his 25th film titled Radha, which was produced by the noted producer B. V. S. N. Prasad under his production banner SVCC cinema, but to mixed reviews. Sharwanand then starred in Mahanubhavudu, which released on 29 September 2017, directed by Maruthi and gained critical and commercial success. 

Sharwanand's last movie was released on 7 February 2020, titled as Jaanu. It was directed by C. Prem Kumar which is a remake of his own Tamil film '96.

After that he starred in Mahasamudram with Siddharth directed by RX100 fame Ajay Bhupathi bankrolled by AK Entertainments which turned out to be a huge flop and then he starred in science fiction Time TravelTelugu and Tamil bilingual oke oka jeevitham with Amala Akkineni ,Ritu Varma directed by shree Karthick bankrolled by Dream Warrior Pictures which turned out to be a huge hit for sharwa after series of flops and he is presently now working as lead  for famous lyricist Krishna Chaitanya directorial bankrolled by People Media Factory it is gonna be a political thriller co starring with Raashii Khanna and Priyamani in important role.

Filmography
Note: All films are in Telugu unless noted otherwise

As actor

As producer

Awards and nominations

See also 
 List of Telugu actors

References

External links 
 

Living people
Telugu film producers
Male actors in Tamil cinema
1984 births
Film producers from Andhra Pradesh
Male actors in Telugu cinema
Indian male film actors
21st-century Indian male actors
Male actors from Vijayawada
South Indian International Movie Awards winners
Male actors from Andhra Pradesh
Telugu male actors